The Central Bank of Somalia (CBS) is the monetary authority of Somalia. Somalia has struggled to reestablish a functioning state since the collapse of an authoritarian regime in 1991. Somalia has been cited as a real-world example of an anarchist stateless society and a country with no formal legal system. The Transitional Federal Government, formed in 2004, was recognized as the central government of Somalia. Among other duties, it is in charge of ensuring financial stability, maintaining the internal and external value of the local currency, and promoting credit and exchange conditions that facilitate the balanced growth of the national economy. Within the scope of its powers, it also contributes to the financial and economic policies of the State.

History
On 15 November 1920, the Banca d'Italia opened a branch in Mogadishu. This was the first banking institution in Italian Somaliland. Then in 1938 Banco di Napoli established a  branch in Mogadishu. (Banco di Napoli replaced Cassa di Risparmio di Torino, which had opened an office in Mogadishu in 1932).

In 1952, National Bank of India (NBI), which later merged with Grindlays Bank to form National and Grindlays Bank, established branches in Berbera and Hargeisa in British Somaliland (now Somaliland). NBI was the first bank in British Somaliland and was the banker to the colonial government until the State of Somaliland (the former British Somaliland) joined the Trust Territory of Somalia (the former Italian Somaliland) to form the Somali Republic in 1960. After the union, National and Grindlays opened a branch in Mogadishu.

In 1940, there were five local bank branches in Italian Somaliland. Banca d'Italia had three: in Mogadishu, Kismayo and Merca. Banco di Roma had two branches; one in Mogadishu and another in Merca. Banco di Napoli had one in Mogadishu. Both Banco di Roma and Banco di Napoli also had branches in other parts of the region, in Eritrea and Ethiopia.

On 1 July 1960, the newly independent Somali Republic established the Banca Nazionale Somala (National Bank of Somalia) to take over the activities of the Cassa per la Circolazione Monetaria della Somali and the Mogadishu branch of Banca d'Italia. The new bank combined central banking activities with commercial banking activities.

In 1968, the Somali Republic's civilian government merged the Somali Credit Bank (Credito Somalo) with the Banca Nazionale Somala. The earlier trusteeship administration had established the Somali Credit Bank in 1954 in the Trust Territory of Somalia.

After the bloodless coup d'état of 1969 that saw Mohamed Siad Barre's ascension to power, the government in 1971 nationalized the four foreign banks. The government combined Banco di Roma, Banco di Napoli, and National and Grindlays Bank to form the Somali Commercial Bank. The government also established the Somali Savings and Credit Bank to take over the commercial branches of Banca Nazionale Somala and Banque de Port Said, leaving the Banca Nazionale Somala with only central banking functions. The Somali Savings and Credit Bank had branches in Baidoa, Beledweyne, Berbera, Bosaso, Burco, Galkacyo, Qardho, Hargeisa and Kismayo, and for a while in Djibouti. The Somali Savings and Credit Bank had been established with the technical assistance and aid provided by the Associazione Bancaria Italiana in the context of an overall cooperation policy of the European savings banks.

On 8 February 1975, the government renamed the Banca Nazionale Somala to the Central Bank of Somalia (Bankiga Dhexe ee Soomaaliya). It also merged the Somali Commercial Bank and Somali Savings and Credit Bank (Cassa di Risparmio e Credito della Somalia) to form the Commercial and Savings Bank of Somalia, which was at the time the only bank in the country. In 1990 the Commercial and Savings Bank of Somalia discontinued operations. At some point the Central Bank of Somalia too ceased functioning.

In 2009, the Transitional Federal Government re-opened the Central Bank of Somalia in Mogadishu as part of its campaign to restore national institutions. The Bank had an additional branch in Baidoa that was already operational with personnel in place.

In September 2013, Yussur A.F. Abrar was named the new Governor of the Central Bank of Somalia. A former Vice-President at Citigroup and Vice-President of Credit Risk Management at the American International Group, she was the first woman to have been appointed to the position. In November 2013, Bashir Isse was appointed on an interim basis as Somalia's Central Bank Governor, following the resignation of his predecessor Abrar earlier in the month. In April 2014, the federal Cabinet approved Isse as the new permanent Central Bank Governor. Maryan Abdullahi Yusuf was also named his new Deputy Governor.

Organizational structure

Organs
In accordance with the Central Bank Act, the organs of the Bank are as follows:

Board of Directors
Governor and Deputy Governor
Director General

The Governor serves as Chair of the Board and is the Bank's Chief Executive Officer. He or she reports to and is a member of the Board of Directors. The Director General deputies for the Governor, and also assumes the role of the Bank's Chief Operations Officer.

Departments
The Central Bank of Somalia's functions are divided into nine departments:

Banking Operations and Payment System
Accounting & Finance
Internal Audit
Economic Research
Supervision
Human Resources
Information Technology Systems
Administration Services
Currency department
Legal Services

Management and administration

Board of Directors
The Board of Directors includes:
Bashir Isse – Governor and Chairman
Maryan Abdullahi Yusuf – Deputy Governor and Deputy Chairman
Yusuf Mohamed Ali – Board Member
Omar Ibrahim Hussein – Board Member
Maye Mohamed Shekhuna – Board Member
Abdirashid Mohamed Siraaji – Board Member
Hodan Said Isse – Board Member

Governors
Abdi Aden Mohamed, ? - 1962 - March 1964
Abdi Haji Abicar, March 1964 - 1968
Abdullahi Ahmed Addow, 1968 - March 1970
Abdurahman Nur Herzi, March 1970 - 1977 - ?
Mohamud Jama Ahmed, 1978 - 1983
Omar Ahmed Omar, ? - 1987 - 1988 - ?
Mahmud Muhommad Nur, ? - 1989 - ? 
Ali Abdi Amalow, October 1990 - ?
In abeyance, January 1991 - March 2001
Mahmamud Mohamed Ulusow, March 2001 - October 2005
Bashir Isse, 2006 - 2010
Abdullahi Jama Ali, ? - 2012 - January 2013
Abdusalam H. Omer, January 2013 - September 2013
Yussur A.F. Abrar, September 2013 – November 2013
Bashir Isse, November 2013 - April 2019
Abdirahman M. Abdullahi, April 2019 – present

Monetary policy

Framework
Chapter II, Art. 2, Section (2) of the Central Bank of Somalia Act stipulates that the functions of the Bank are as follows:

Objectives
The Central Bank of Somalia's medium and longer-term monetary policy objectives are:

Price stability.
Formulating and implementing monetary and exchange rate policies.
Maintaining and enhancing the value of the Somali shilling.
Maintaining financial stability.
Harmonizing and coordinating government fiscal policies with monetary policies.
Promoting a sound credit and payments system both internationally and internally.

Overview
In terms of financial management, the newly revived Central Bank of Somalia is in the process of assuming the task of both formulating and implementing monetary policy.

Owing to a lack of confidence in the local currency, the US dollar is widely accepted as a medium of exchange alongside the Somali shilling. Dollarization notwithstanding, the large issuance of the Somali shilling has increasingly fueled price hikes, especially for low value transactions. This inflationary environment, however, is expected to come to an end as soon as the Central Bank assumes full control of monetary policy and replaces the presently circulating currency introduced by the private sector.

Payment system
Although Somalia has had no central monetary authority for upwards of 15 years between the outbreak of the civil war in 1991 and the subsequent re-establishment of the Central Bank of Somalia in 2009, the nation's payment system is actually fairly advanced due primarily to the widespread existence of private money transfer operators (MTO) that have acted as informal banking networks.

These remittance firms (hawalas) have become a large industry in Somalia, with an estimated US$1.6 billion annually remitted to the region by Somalis in the diaspora via money transfer companies. The latter include Dahabshiil,  Express, Mustaqbal, Amal Express, Kaah Express, Hodan Global, Olympic, Amana Express, Iftin Express and Tawakal Express. Most are credentialed members of the Somali Money Transfer Association (SOMTA), an umbrella organization that regulates the community's money transfer sector, or its predecessor, the Somali Financial Services Association (SFSA).

As the reconstituted Central Bank of Somalia fully assumes its monetary policy responsibilities, some of the existing money transfer companies are expected in the near future to seek licenses so as to develop into full-fledged commercial banks. This will serve to broaden the scope of the national payments system to include formal cheques, which in turn is expected to reinforce the effectiveness of the use of monetary policy in domestic macroeconomic management.

Banking supervision
The financial institution Decree Law No. 37 of November 23, 1989 mandates the Central Bank of Somalia to oversee domestic financial institutions through the CBS' banking supervision department.

Financial institutions supervised by the CBS are:

Commercial banks
Credit institutions
Forex bureaus
Money transfer operators (MTO)

See also

 Somali shilling
 Economy of Somalia
 Arab Banks
 List of banks in Somalia
 List of central banks of Africa
 List of central banks

Notes

References
Mauri, Arnaldo, Banking Development in Somalia, SSRN 958442 (1971).
Tuccimei, Ercole, La Banca d'Italia in Africa, Foreword by Arnaldo Mauri, Laterza, Bari, 1999.

External links
 
 Arab Bankers Association of North America

Economy of Somalia
Companies of Somalia
Somalia
Banks of Somalia
Economy of Mogadishu
1960 establishments in Somalia
Banks established in 1960